Vahdat (also Romanized as Vaḥdat) is a village in Hasanabad Rural District, in the Central District of Eslamabad-e Gharb County, Kermanshah Province, Iran. At the 2006 census, its population was 539 citizens or 111 households.

References 

Populated places in Eslamabad-e Gharb County